Ian McGinty (born May 6, 1985) is an American comic book writer, and artist known for his work on Adventure Time, Bee and PuppyCat and Invader Zim. He is best known for his creator owned comic Welcome to Showside.

Biography

In 2015, Ian McGinty announced that he would be developing his creator own comic series Welcome to Showside, into an animated series. starring Henry Rollins, Amanda Kaufman, and Ian McGinty as Kit.

Ian currently resides in Los Angeles, California.

Bibliography
Ian McGinty's comic and graphic novel work include:

Nickelodeon Studios
INVADER ZIM #15 (W) Eric Trueheart, Danielle Koening, KC Green, Ian McGinty, Jamie Smart (A) Warren Wucinich, KC Green, Ian McGinty with Fred C. Stresing and Meg Casey.

Boom! Studios
 Adventure Time #54, Story by Christopher Hastings. Art by Ian McGinty. Colors by Maarta Laiho. Letters by Steve Wands. Cover by Jackie Forrentino, Veronica Fish.
 Adventure Time: Candy Capers by Yuko Ota, Ananth Panagariya, Ian McGinty (Illustrations) 
 Bee and Puppycat #3, created with Madeleine Flores, Ian McGinty, Anissa Espinosa, and Tait Howard.
 Munchkin #3  Writer(s): Tom Siddell, Jim Zub Artist(s): Ian McGinty
 Bravest Warriors #21-36 By Kate Leth & Ian McGinty

Other publishers
 Welcome to Showside #1, Story and Art by Ian McGinty

Notes

External links

1985 births
American comics artists
American graphic novelists
Living people